Mailing is a town in Fuchuan Yao Autonomous County, Guangxi, China.

Administrative division
As of 2016, the town is divided into one community and thirteen villages: 
 Mailing Community
 Mailing
 Changchun
 Daba
 Xinzao
 Xiaotian
 Xiulin
 Gaoqiao
 Yongquan
 Yuetang
 Cunhuang
 Jintian
 Hemu
 Sanmin

History
In 1996 it was upgraded to a town.

Geography
The town is situated at the northeastern Fuchuan Yao Autonomous County. It is bordered to the north by Jiangyong County, to the east by Shijia Township, to the south by Gepo Town, and to the west by Chaodong Town.

The Changchun Reservoir is a reservoir located in the town, which provides drinking water and water for irrigation.

The Mailing Stream, Jintian Stream, Fujiang River and Gongtang Stream flow through the town.

Economy
The main industries in and around the town are forestry and farming. Commercial crops include tobacco, peanut and Camellia oleifera.

Transportation
The town is connected to two highways: the China National Highway G538 and the S13 Zhongshan County–Fuchuan County Expressway.

References

Bibliography

Towns of Hezhou